Kim Staal (born March 10, 1978) is a Danish former professional ice hockey forward, who last played with Herlev Eagles.

Despite his surname, he is not related to the Staal family of Thunder Bay, Ontario, Canada, which consists of hockey playing brothers Eric, Marc, Jordan and Jared, who are Canadians of Dutch descent.

Playing career
Staal was drafted by the Montreal Canadiens as their fourth-round pick in the 1996 NHL Entry Draft. He spent his early professional career in the Swedish elite league, playing for Malmö IF and Modo Hockey. Staal also played in the Denmark national ice hockey team and participated in twelve Ice Hockey World Championships between 2003 and 2015. In 2006, he signed with the Milwaukee Admirals of the AHL. He signed with Linköpings HC in July 2007 and with HV71 on June 19, for one season. After an injury-prone season with HV71, he signed with Malmö Redhawks in HockeyAllsvenskan.

Staal was often popular with fans and teammates due to his outgoing nature and sense of humour. In Sweden, his nickname is "Staalmannen", which literally means "man of steel". Stålmannen is also the Swedish name for Superman.

Awards
 Named to the Elitserien All-Star Game in 2001 and 2002.
 Elitserien silver medal in 2002, 2008 and 2009.

Career statistics

International play
Staal has played for Denmark in the following competitions:

 2003 World Championships
 2004 World Championships
 2005 World Championships
 2006 World Championships
 2007 World Championships
 2008 World Championships
 2009 World Championships
 2010 World Championships
 2011 World Championships
 2013 World Championships
 2014 World Championships
 2015 World Championships

International statistics

References

External links

1978 births
Danish ice hockey right wingers
Herlev Hornets players
Herning Blue Fox players
HV71 players
Linköping HC players
Living people
Malmö Redhawks players
Milwaukee Admirals players
Modo Hockey players
Montreal Canadiens draft picks
People from Herlev Municipality
Starbulls Rosenheim players
Tohoku Free Blades players
Sportspeople from the Capital Region of Denmark